Christ on a Bike is the title of:

 A show by Richard Herring, a British comedian
 A short story by Ami McKay, a Canadian writer
 A comic strip in Viz, a British adult spoof comic magazine